Notre-Dame-de-la-Merci is a municipality in the Lanaudière region of Quebec, Canada, part of the Matawinie Regional County Municipality.

Demographics

Population

Private dwellings occupied by usual residents: 619 (total dwellings: 1206)

Language
Mother tongue:
 English as first language: 2.7%
 French as first language: 93.2%
 English and French as first language: 0.9%
 Other as first language: 2.7%

Education

Commission scolaire des Samares operates Francophone public schools:
 Notre-Dame-de-la-Merci — Saint-Émile (pavillon Notre-Dame-de-la-Merci)

Sir Wilfrid Laurier School Board operates Anglophone public schools:
 Rawdon Elementary School in Rawdon
 Joliette High School in Joliette

Notable people
 Ray Daviault , Baseball pitcher for the New York Mets

See also
List of municipalities in Quebec

References

Incorporated places in Lanaudière
Municipalities in Quebec
Matawinie Regional County Municipality